WinSCP (Windows Secure Copy) is a free and open-source SSH File Transfer Protocol (SFTP), File Transfer Protocol (FTP), WebDAV, Amazon S3, and secure copy protocol (SCP) client for Microsoft Windows. Its main function is secure file transfer between a local computer and a remote server. Beyond this, WinSCP offers basic file manager and file synchronization functionality. For secure transfers, it uses the Secure Shell protocol (SSH) and supports the SCP protocol in addition to SFTP.

Development of WinSCP started around March 2000 and continues. Originally it was hosted by the University of Economics in Prague, where its author worked at the time. Since July 16, 2003, it is licensed under the GNU GPL. It is hosted on SourceForge and GitHub.

WinSCP is based on the implementation of the SSH protocol from PuTTY and FTP protocol from FileZilla. It is also available as a plugin for Altap Salamander file manager, and there exists a third-party plugin for the FAR file manager.

Features

Graphical user interface
Translated into several languages
Integration with Windows (drag and drop, URL, shortcut icons)
All common operations with files
Support for SFTP and SCP protocols over SSH-1 and SSH-2, FTP protocol, WebDAV protocol and Amazon S3 protocol.
Batch file scripting, command-line interface, and .NET wrapper
Can act as a remote text editor, either downloading a file to edit or passing it on to a local application, then uploading it again when updated.
Directory synchronization in several semi or fully automatic ways
Support for SSH password, keyboard-interactive, public key, and Kerberos (GSS) authentication
Integrates with Pageant (PuTTY authentication agent) for full support of public key authentication with SSH
Choice of Windows File Explorer-like or Norton Commander-like interfaces
Optionally stores session information
Optionally import session information from PuTTY sessions in the registry
Able to upload files and retain associated original date/timestamps, unlike FTP clients

Apart from the standard package, three portable versions are also available: A generic package and two customized versions for LiberKey and PortableApps.com. The portable version runs on Wine on several POSIX-compliant operating systems, such as Linux, macOS, and BSD.

Some older versions of the WinSCP installer included OpenCandy advertising module or bundled Google Chrome. Since version 5.5.5 (August 2014) the installer does not contain any advertisement.

See also

Comparison of file managers
Comparison of SSH clients
Comparison of FTP client software

References

External links

Documentation

Cryptographic software
Data synchronization
Free file managers
Free file transfer software
Free FTP clients
Free multilingual software
Free software programmed in C++
Orthodox file managers
Portable software
SSH File Transfer Protocol clients
Utilities for Windows
Windows-only free software